Elidir Fawr is a mountain in Snowdonia, north Wales, the northernmost peak in the Glyderau. Its name means 'Big Elidir', named after a legendary warrior king of the 6th century also known as Eliffer Gosgorddfawr (Elidir of the Great Army).

To the north of the summit is a small lake, Marchlyn Mawr, which is the upper reservoir for Dinorwig power station, a pump-storage power station hidden inside the mountain. Water from this lake flows through huge tunnels into the lower reservoir Llyn Peris. From the north, Elidir Fawr is very prominent, and can appear to be higher than the higher mountains behind it.

Slate quarries
From Llanberis, the mountain is dominated by the former Dinorwic slate quarries and the waste they have left behind.

Approach
It is a reasonably short, but steep walk up to the summit, and this can be undertaken from the Deiniolen side or from Nant Peris. The Deiniolen walk provides views down to Llanberis, while the Nant Peris approach is short and quite steep. The summit can also be reached from Ogwen Cottage via a traverse of Y Garn and Foel-goch. The route makes its way around the headwall of Cwm Dudodyn to Bwlch y Brecan and up to the rocky summit of Elidir Fawr.

References

External links 
 Walks to the summit
 www.geograph.co.uk : photos of and from Elidir Fawr

Marilyns of Wales
Hewitts of Wales
Mountains and hills of Snowdonia
Nuttalls
Furths
Mountains and hills of Gwynedd
Llanberis
Llanddeiniolen